William Philip Honywood (15 April 1790 – 22 April 1831) was an English Whig politician who sat in the House of Commons from 1818 to 1830.

Early life and education 
Honywood was the eldest son of William Honywood and his wife Mary Brockman. He graduated from Rugby in 1800 and Jesus College, Cambridge in 1808.

Military career 
He was a Captain in the Ashford regiment of the Kent militia in 1809.

Politics 
Honywood was a staunch Whig and was elected Member of Parliament (MP) for Kent at the 1818 general election. He held the seat until the 1830 general election when he retired on the grounds of ill-health.

Personal live and death 
He married Priscilla Hanbury, the daughter of Charles Hanbury of Sloe Farm, Halstead on 11 September 1820. They had three sons: William Philip, Robert, and Walter; and one daughter. The Honywoods lived at Marks Hall, Essex. Honywood died aged 41 on 22 April 1831.

References

External links 
 

1831 deaths
1790 births
Members of the Parliament of the United Kingdom for English constituencies
UK MPs 1818–1820
UK MPs 1820–1826
UK MPs 1826–1830
Whig (British political party) MPs for English constituencies